John W. Millar (31 December 1927 – November 1991) was a Scottish professional footballer who played as an inside forward for Queen of the South, Bradford City and Grimsby Town.

References

1927 births
1991 deaths
Scottish footballers
Queen of the South F.C. players
Bradford City A.F.C. players
Grimsby Town F.C. players
English Football League players
Association football inside forwards
Footballers from Fife
People from Cardenden